The Mixed Doubles tournament of the 2013 Asian Junior Badminton Championships was held from July 10–14 in Kota Kinabalu, Malaysia. The defending champion of in this event were Choi Sol-kyu and Chae Yoo-jung of South Korea. Choi and Chae successfully claim the title back to back after beating Chinese pair, the second seeded Liu Yuchen and Huang Dongping in the finals with the score 21–11, 19–21, 21–13.

Seeded

  Choi Sol-kyu / Chae Yoo-jung (champion)
  Liu Yuchen / Huang Dongping (final)
  Huang Kaixiang / Chen Qingchen (semi-final)
  Tang Chun Man / Ng Wing Yung (quarter-final)
  Dechapol Puavaranukroh / Puttita Supajirakul (quarter-final)
  Kim Jung-ho / Kim Ji-won (semi-final)
  Chua Khek Wei / Yap Cheng Wen (quarter-final)
  Darren Isaac Devadass / Joyce Choong Wai Chi (second round)

Draw

Finals

Top Half

Section 1

Section 2

Section 3

Section 4

Bottom Half

Section 5

Section 6

Section 7

Section 8

References

External links 
Main Draw (Archived 2013-07-13)

Mixed
Asia Junior